The qualifying rounds for the 1997 US Open were played from 20 to 23 August 1997 in the USTA National Tennis Center in Flushing Meadows, New York, United States.

Seeds

Qualifiers

Draw

First qualifier

Second qualifier

Third qualifier

Fourth qualifier

References
 Official Results Archive (WTA)
1997 US Open – Women's draws and results at the International Tennis Federation

Women's Doubles Qualifying
US Open (tennis) by year – Qualifying